The National Hockey League (NHL) evolved from a mono-ethnic and primarily Canadian professional athletic league to span North America. The distribution of ethnic groups has been gradually changing since the inception of the NHL. The league consists of a variety of players from varying nationalities and diverse backgrounds. Once known as a league riddled with racism and exclusiveness, the NHL has made some positive steps toward a more diverse and inclusive institution.

The NHL began its expansion of player nationalities in the 1970s, when players hailed from the United States, Sweden, and Finland. The share of Canadians in the league dropped to 75% by the 1980s and is now slightly less than 50%. In 2011, the NHL was composed of 93% of players who identified as white, with the remaining 7% identifying as varying ethnicities.

History

A number of ice hockey leagues for players of African descent formed in Canada as early as the late-19th century. The Coloured Hockey League was an all-black ice hockey league established in 1895. Operating across the Maritime provinces of Canada, the league operated for several decades until 1930.

Although other ice hockey leagues saw integration in the early 20th century (including the Quebec Senior Hockey League), the NHL did not see its first non-white player until March 13, 1948, when Larry Kwong broke the NHL's colour barrier playing with the New York Rangers. Born in Vernon, British Columbia, Kwong was a Chinese Canadian of Cantonese descent. In 1953, Fred Sasakamoose was the first Cree NHL player, and the first Canadian indigenous player in the NHL, debuting with the Chicago Black Hawks. On January 18, 1958, Willie O'Ree became the first Black Canadian to play in the NHL. Playing with the Boston Bruins, he was also the first NHL player of African-descent. Val James was the first African American player to play in the NHL. James signed his contract with the Buffalo Sabres in 1982. His stints with the Buffalo Sabres and Toronto Maple Leafs were short lived and he eventually retired in 1987 due to injury. The number of black NHL players was to 26 by the end of the 20th century and sat at 32 in 2016.

Non-black minorities
In addition to black and white players, other races and ethnicities represented in the NHL include players of Asian, Latino, and Middle Eastern descent.

Bold = Currently playing in NHL
Italics = Stanley Cup champions
* = Yet to have played an NHL game for their respective team

Asian descent

NHL career
These are the top-ten players of Asian descent by career points, goals, and assists. Figures are updated after each completed NHL regular season.

Note: Pos = Position; GP = Games played; G = Goals; A = Assists; Pts = Points; P/G = Points per game; G/G = Goals per game; A/G = Assists per game

Franchise career
These are the top-ten players of Asian descent, by career points, goals, and assists, when counting only their production with a specific franchise. Figures are updated after each completed NHL regular season.

''Note: Pos = Position; GP = Games played; G = Goals; A = Assists; Pts = Points; P/G = Points per game; G/G = Goals per game; A/G = Assists per game

First Nation/Native American descent

Latino descent

Middle Eastern descent

See also
Baseball color line
Black players in ice hockey
List of black NHL players
Black players in professional American football
History of African Americans in the Canadian Football League
Race and ethnicity in the NBA

References

African Americans and sport
National Hockey League
Race and society
Ethnicity